Darmian (also Romanized as Darmīān and Darmeyān) is a village in Zhan Rural District, in the Central District of Dorud County, Lorestan Province, Iran. At the 2006 census, its population was 505, in 95 families.

References 

Towns and villages in Dorud County